The Presbyterian Iglesia Nicea is a Hispanic Presbyterian church at 401 S. DeLeon in Victoria, Texas.  It was designed by architect Jules Leffland.  It was listed on the National Register of Historic Places in 1992.

Land for the church was donated by Mrs. John M. Brownson, wife of the founder of Victoria National Bank.  It is a one-story wood-frame church that was built in 1910.  In 1934 the building was moved to allow for addition of a Sunday School hall and a fellowship hall.

It was listed on the NRHP as part of a study which listed numerous historic resources in the Victoria area.

See also

National Register of Historic Places listings in Victoria County, Texas

References

Churches on the National Register of Historic Places in Texas
Carpenter Gothic church buildings in Texas
Churches completed in 1910
Churches in Victoria County, Texas
Presbyterian churches in Texas
Buildings and structures in Victoria, Texas
National Register of Historic Places in Victoria, Texas